Ondina diaphana is a species of sea snail, a marine gastropod mollusk in the family Pyramidellidae, the pyrams and their allies.

Description
The lustrous, whitish shell is very thin and nearly transparent. Its length varies between 1.8 mm and 2.5 mm. The teleoconch contains five whorls. The sculpture is marked by microscopic growth lines. The oblique suture is narrow. The outer lip is flexuous, and deeply sinuous above. The columellar tooth is obsolete. The insignicant umbilicus is developed in the adult only.

Distribution
This species occurs in the following locations:
 Atlantic Ocean : Azores 
 North Sea : European waters, United Kingdom 
 Mediterranean Sea

References

 Hayward, P.J.; Ryland, J.S. (Ed.) (1990). The marine fauna of the British Isles and North-West Europe: 1. Introduction and protozoans to arthropods. Clarendon Press: Oxford, UK. . 627 pp

External links
 To Biodiversity Heritage Library (1 publication)
 To CLEMAM
 To Encyclopedia of Life
 To GenBank
 To Marine Species Identification Portal
 To World Register of Marine Species
 

Pyramidellidae
Gastropods described in 1848